Jens-Carl Kristensen, alternatively spelled Jens-Carl Christensen (born 2 March 1933), is a Danish former football (soccer) player, who played for Akademisk Boldklub in Denmark. He was the top goalscorer of the 1954 Danish football championship, and played one game for the Denmark national football team. He moved abroad to play professionally for La Chaux-de-Fonds in France.

References

External links
Danish national team profile

1933 births
Living people
Danish men's footballers
Denmark international footballers
Association footballers not categorized by position